A. S. A. Arumugam was an Indian politician and former Member of the Legislative Assembly. He was elected to the Tamil Nadu legislative assembly as a Janata Party candidate from Virudhunagar constituency in 1984 election.

References 

Tamil Nadu politicians
Living people
Janata Party politicians
Year of birth missing (living people)
Tamil Nadu MLAs 1985–1989